WGTO (branded as "97.1 & 910 MeTV FM") is a radio station broadcasting a soft oldies format. It is licensed to Cassopolis, Michigan broadcasting on AM 910 kHz and is under ownership of Langford Broadcasting. Much of the programming comes from MeTVfm.

This station first began broadcasting in 1986 under the WLLJ call sign and originally featured an urban contemporary format.

WGTO was designed and built by longtime Chicago radio personality Larry Langford in 1987 as WLLJ. WGTO is the last station to be built under the AM daytime rules of the Federal Communications Commission. After the Construction Permit for this station was authorized in 1986 no further applications were accepted for stations wanting to operate Daytime Only. WGTO uses two towers in a directional pattern. The station now operates with 35 watts of nighttime power.

In 2007, Langford purchased a competing radio station in the same county and now became the owner of both WGTO and WDOW, which has since gone silent to allow a station in Kalamazoo to broadcast on its frequency.

On October 30, 2009, WGTO began broadcasting on 101.1 FM (translator W266BS licensed to Cassopolis, Michigan) as "Classic Hits 101." They continue to broadcast their AM signal as well.  In June 2016, the FM translator moved to a new frequency of 96.3 MHz with call sign W242CN. The new translator broadcasts with an ERP of 250 watts, the maximum allowed for translators, and extends WGTO's FM coverage from the immediate Cassopolis/Dowagiac area to include a larger portion of southwestern Michigan as well as the Elkhart, Indiana area. Effective January 25, 2018, the translator moved to 96.7 MHz, as W244DS. The translator was moved in fall of 2018 to 97.1 with tower located to provide local coverage of South Bend Indiana and Niles Michigan. The South Bend location gives Larry Langford a second South Bend opportunity as he was the original owner and founder of WUBU in South Bend known as Mix 106. He transferred those call letters from Portage Michigan where he owned WUBU 96.5 before bringing in partner Abe Thompson and moving WUBU to South Bend. Kool FM now resides on a tower owned by Federated Media.

In July 2017, the website was changed to: http://www.kool967fm.com

On July 4, 2020, the station was changed over to the MeTV FM radio format from Weigel Broadcasting; the station will be cross-promoted on Weigel's three area television stations, including WBND-LD2, an owned-and-operated MeTV station. The shift was made in an effort to differentiate its playlist from higher-rated classic hits stations while still maintaining a familiar format to the station's loyal listeners, along with bringing a station with a cult following from the area's Chicago area commuters into the South Bend market.

Since the summer of 2021 WGTO has also been heard on translator 97.5 W248AP Valparaiso, Indiana.

References

External links
{https://www.971.fm MeTVfm/WGTO official website]
Michiguide.com - WGTO History

GTO
Oldies radio stations in the United States
Radio stations established in 1989
1986 establishments in Michigan